Redstone Solar Thermal Power (RSTP) is a solar power tower with molten salt energy storage, located in Postmasburg, near Kimberley, in the Northern Cape Region of South Africa.  Redstone will have a capacity of 100 megawatts (MW) to deliver power to 200,000 people and was awarded in bid window 3.5 of the REIPPP at a strike price of  122.3 ZAR/KWh including time of day pricing in 2015.
The project was initially based on the technology of now bankrupt Solar Reserve, but was delayed for several years because the PPA was not signed by Eskom until 2018.
After the project was revived the plant is now under construction   and the  technology will be provided by Brightsource and John Cockerill, as demonstrated in the  Noor Energy 1 project in the UAE.

Announcement in 2015 
In January 2015, the South Africa Department of Energy awarded the RSTP project to a consortium led by SolarReserve and the Arabian Company for Water and Power Development (ACWA Power).  The project was to achieve financial close at end of  2015 and commence operations in early 2018. Overall project cost were estimated at $715 million, and basic power tariff offered at $124/MW·h.  Peak power tariff is 270% of the basic power tariff i.e. $334/MW·h.  Tariffs quoted in Rands, fully indexed, were R1.70/kWh base rate and R4.58/kWh peak rate (2015 rate). The RSTP project would create 800 direct jobs during construction, with a planned 30-year operating life.

Technology 
The RSTP project features a 2-tank direct molten salt energy storage with 12 hours of full-load energy storage, namely 1200 MW·h of equivalent power production, avoiding any backup fuel requirement. The RSTP project is located adjacent the 75 MW Lesedi and 96 MW Jasper photovoltaic solar power projects. Together the three projects comprise a combined CSP and PV solar park with a total 271 MW of generating capacity.

Delay since 2016 
In early 2016, the  power purchase agreement (PPA) worth R50 billion with Eskom was postponed because of a generation surplus.

In April 2018, the purchase power agreement (PPA) with Eskom was signed. In August 2019, it was reported that financing for Redstone was complete.

It is unclear what the bankruptcy of technology provider SolarReserve in 2020 means for the project. On 10 May 2021 ACWA Power announced the achievement of financial close, with commercial operations expected to commence in Q4 2023.

See also

List of solar thermal power stations
List of power stations in South Africa
Solar thermal energy
Crescent Dunes Solar Energy Project

References

Solar thermal energy
Solar power stations in South Africa
Economy of the Northern Cape